The following are the members of the Dewan Undangan Negeri or state assemblies, elected in the 2008 state election and by-elections. Also included is the list of the Sarawak state assembly members who were elected in 2011.

Composition

<onlyinclude>

Perlis

Kedah

Elected members

Seating arrangement

Kelantan

Terengganu

Penang

Perak

Pahang

Selangor

Negeri Sembilan

Malacca

Johor

Sabah

Sarawak

2011–2016

There were several desertions from Sarawak United Peoples' Party (SUPP) and Sarawak Progressive Democratic Party (SPDP) in the state governing coalition Barisan Nasional, in which these members joined independent parties such as Sarawak People's Energy Party (TERAS) and United People's Party (UPP) which were otherwise friendly to Barisan Nasional. The opposition coalition Pakatan Rakyat that contested the Sarawak state elections in 2011 was dissolved after series of disagreements between two main parties, Democratic Action Party(DAP) and Pan-Malaysian Islamic Party (PAS).
A new opposition coalition Pakatan Harapan was formed by the Democratic Action Party, People's Justice Party (PKR) and newly formed party  National Trust Party (PAN), consisting of ex-PAS members.

Notes

References

2008 elections in Malaysia